Ranikot Fort (also known as Rannikot) is a historical Talpur fort near Sann, Jamshoro District, Sindh. in Pakistan. The fort's ramparts have been compared to the Great Wall of China.

The site was nominated in 1993 by the Pakistan National Commission for UNESCO world heritage status, and has since been on the tentative list of UNESCO World Heritage Sites. The fort is listed as a historical site under the Antiquities Act, 1975 and its subsequent amendments, and is provided protection.

Location

There is also an easy access of about an hour's journey from Karachi to Sann on the Indus Highway. A diversion road, starting a little distance away from Sann, the nearest town, leads to the fort along a rugged  road and reaches the eastern gate of the fort, known as Sann Gate. Sann is a rail head on the Kotri-Larkana line of the Pakistan Railway. The fort is inside the Kirthar National Park, the second largest national park in Pakistan.

History
The original purpose and architects of Ranikot Fort are unknown. It was formerly believed that the fort was built during the regimes of the Sassanians, the Scythians, the Parthians or the Bactrian Greeks, however, more recent evidence shows that the fort originated under the Talpurs and constructed during the administration of Nawab Wali Muhammed Leghari, the Prime Minister of Sindh during the Talpur dynasty.

Archaeologists point to the 17th century as the time of its first construction but Sindh archaeologists now agree that some of the present structures were reconstructed by the Talpur dynasty in 1812 at a cost of 1.2 million rupees (Sindh Gazetteer, 677). The battlements of Ranikot formed the last capital of the Amirs of Sind, when they were brought under the colonial rule of the British Empire. Radiocarbon tests were conducted at the Sann Gate on the charcoal embedded in the mortar of a collapsed pillar of the eastern gate of the fort. These tests have confirmed that this gate was probably renovated between the early part of the 18th century and the early part of the 19th century, prior to Britain invading the fort when the Kalhoras, or most likely the Talpur Mirs of Sindh ruled over the area.

Features

The fort is huge, connecting several bleak mountains of the Kirthar hills along contours, and measures  in length. The fort's wall is interspersed with several bastions, and three are of semi-circular shape. The northern part of the fort's perimeter is a natural high hilly formation while on the other three sides it is covered by fort walls. Within this main fort there is a smaller fort known as the "Miri Fort" which is about 3 km from the Sann gate, and is reported to have served as the palace of the Mir royal family. The entire fort structure has been built with stone and lime mortar. The fort is built in a zig-zag form, with four entry gates in the shape of a rhomboid. The four gates are namely: Sann Gate, Amri Gate, Shah-Pere Gate and Mohan Gate. Two of the gates, facing each are crossed diagonally by the Sann river; the first gate is on the western side and is skirted by the river water and is difficult to approach. The southern entry gate has a double doors gate. Within the gates there are two niches which have floral ornamentation and carved stones.  The Sann gate is well preserved and can be climbed to reach the top of the fort from both sides to get a scenic view of the terrain around the fort. This gate is also the entrance to the Meeri.

Restoration
The Fort was first restored by Nawab Wali Muhammed Leghari, who was the Prime Minister of Sindh under the Talpur dynasty. Restoration works were undertaken on the fort, particularly on the Sann Gate complex, the fortification wall extending south including the mosque and the small Meeri fort or palace within the main fort. These were undertaken by the Archaeology department of Pakistan, the Department of Culture of Sindh and the Dadu District administration. Following allegations of poor construction and favoritism in award of contracts an enquiry was instituted in 2005. The Enquiry Commission's report indicated that the restoration works were poorly done with cement and new stone work without conforming to the "Venice Charter for the Conservation and Restoration of Monuments and Sites" and recommended stoppage of further work on the fort. Based on this report further restoration work was suspended in 2006.

Gallery

See also
List of UNESCO World Heritage Sites in Pakistan
List of forts in Pakistan
List of museums in Pakistan

References

Bibliography

Further reading

.
 Ranikot Fort – The Great Wall of Pakistan – also Known as the Mysterious Place in Pakistan

Forts in Sindh
Hyderabad District, Pakistan
Monuments and memorials in Sindh
Buildings and structures in Jamshoro District